Froggy Gorman (15 February 1843 – 7 May 1905) was an Australian cricketer. He played one first-class match for New South Wales in 1862/63.

See also
 List of New South Wales representative cricketers

References

External links
 

1843 births
1905 deaths
Australian cricketers
New South Wales cricketers
Cricketers from Sydney